The Kisha is a right tributary of the river Belaya in southwest Russia. It is fed by the glaciers of the Chugush mountain and flows for 52 km through the Republic of Adygea.

References

Rivers of Adygea